Gisele Abramoff (born in Rio de Janeiro, Brazil) is a Brazilian Pop Dance singer and songwriter based in Munich.

Background 
Abramoff began her career at 16 years old. In 2000, she appeared in the Brazilian soap opera, Vila Madalena under the nickname Giselle Haller and performed Still Hurts and Back for good.

In 2003 and 2004, she performed in the weekly Rede Globo TV live show Domingão do Faustão, as a member of Edinho Santa Cruz Band for two years.

In 2006, she performed at the TV Show Superpop presented by Brazilian host, Luciana Gimenez and performed a new remix for Livin on a Prayer.

In April 2007, she was featured in a remix of Tiko's Groove song, Say it Right. That year, she composed Last Forever in partnership with Edinho Santa Cruz which was featured in his CD Bee Gees.

She is the vocalist of the former Brazilian electronic dance music group, Dalimas which she formed in 2003 with producer Tibor Yuzo and DJ Tom Hopkins. In 2004, she performed with the group at the Planet Pop Festival, in São Paulo, it was the first time for her to present to a large number of audience. Beside performing with the group in 2004, they also performed in 2005 and 2006 at the Planet Pop Festival editions where they presented new versions for classics such as Livin' On A Prayer by Bon Jovi, Sweet Child O' Mine by Guns N' Roses, Everlasting Love and Your Love by The Outfield. In 2005, the group released their first album Dreams, the album was also released on compact disc (CD) by Building Record. In 2006 they recorded the song Let's get Loud produced and composed by Mister Jam.The group announced its break up in 2007.

In 2019, Abramoff released 3 singles Run To Me, Like You and Something which peaked the 1st position on the digital website DJ Pool in June, and the third place on House Charts.

On 19 August 2020, she participated in the RTL TV show, I can see your Voice and performed Jennifer Lopez single Let's get Loud and Alicia Keys If I Ain't Got You.

In 2020, Abramoff signed with Universal Music Brazil and DJ Sound Music for new releases such as Lockdown. The same year, she participated in the vocals for Samba do Noite by DJ Roger Sanchez (The S-Man).

Discography 

 2007 - Say It Right (remix)
 2019 - Run To Me
 2019- Something
 2019- Like You
 2020 - Samba do Noite
 2021 - Lockdown

Dreams album with Dalimas 

 Sweet Child O' Mine
 Living On A Prayer
 Lies
 Dangerous
 Shine
 Your Love
 I Feel You Tonight
 Without Love
 Angel
 Walking Alone
 Dreams
 Never Gonna Say Goodbye
 Everlasting Love
 Living On A Prayer
 Your Love

Personal life 
Gisele Abramoff is married and living with her family in Munich.

References

External links 
 Gisele Abramoff discography at Discogs

Brazilian pop singers
21st-century Brazilian singers
21st-century Brazilian women singers
Brazilian women singer-songwriters
Brazilian singer-songwriters
Living people

Year of birth missing (living people)